Terry Grant McDonald (born June 17, 1955) is a Canadian former ice hockey defenceman.

Early life 
Born in Coquitlam, British Columbia, McDonald played junior hockey with the Vancouver Villas and Kamloops Chiefs.

Career 
McDonald was drafted 74th overall by the Kansas City Scouts in the 1975 NHL Amateur Draft and played eight games for the Scouts in the 1975–76 season, scoring one assist and accumulating six penalty minutes. The rest of his career was spent in the minor leagues, and he retired in 1979.

Career statistics

Regular season and playoffs

External links

References 

1955 births
Living people
Canadian ice hockey defencemen
Coquitlam Comets players
Flint Generals (IHL) players
Ice hockey people from British Columbia
Kamloops Chiefs players
Kansas City Scouts draft picks
Kansas City Scouts players
New England Whalers draft picks
People from Coquitlam
Phoenix Roadrunners (CHL) players
Port Huron Flags players
Rhode Island Reds players
Springfield Indians players
World Hockey Association first round draft picks
Vancouver Nats players